James Edward Murphy (28 December 1887 – 7 October 1961) was an Irish politician. A draper, he was elected unopposed as a Sinn Féin Teachta Dála (TD) to the Second Dáil at the 1921 elections for the Louth–Meath constituency. He supported the Anglo-Irish Treaty and voted in favour of it. He was re-elected as a pro-Treaty Sinn Féin TD at the 1922 general election.

At the 1923 general election, he was elected as a Cumann na nGaedheal TD for the Louth constituency. He was re-elected at each subsequent general election until he lost his seat at the 1937 general election. 

He was a founding member of Council 32 of the Knights of St Columbanus in Drogheda and was secretary for many years and was Grand Knight in 1942 and 1943. He is buried in St. Peter's Cemetery.

References

1887 births
1961 deaths
Early Sinn Féin TDs
Cumann na nGaedheal TDs
Fine Gael TDs
Members of the 2nd Dáil
Members of the 3rd Dáil
Members of the 4th Dáil
Members of the 5th Dáil
Members of the 6th Dáil
Members of the 7th Dáil
Members of the 8th Dáil
Politicians from County Louth